In finance, date rolling occurs when a payment day or date used to calculate accrued interest falls on a holiday, according to a given business calendar. In this case the date is moved forward or backward in time such that it falls in a business day, according with the same business calendar. 

The choice of the date rolling rule is conventional. Conventional rules used in finance are:

Actual: paid on the actual day, even if it is a non-business day.
Following business day: the payment date is rolled to the next business day.
Modified following business day: the payment date is rolled to the next business day, unless doing so would cause the payment to be in the next calendar month, in which case the payment date is rolled to the previous business day. Many institutions have month-end accounting procedures that necessitate this.
Previous business day: the payment date is rolled to the previous business day.
Modified previous business day: the payment date is rolled to the previous business day, unless doing so would cause the payment to be in the previous calendar month, in which case the payment date is rolled to the next business day. Many institutions have month-end accounting procedures that necessitate this.
Modified Rolling business day: the payment date is rolled to the next business day. The adjusted week date is used for the next coupon date. So adjustments are cumulative (excluding month change).

Date rolling is particularly important for over-the-counter derivatives, whose payment and end dates may potentially fall on any date. For standardized derivatives, in order to avoid problems with month ends, the payment and termination dates are generally chosen to fall in the middle of the month, as in the IMM dates on futures and options contracts, and the similar dates on standardized credit default swaps.

See also 
 Day count convention

External links 
 jFin pure java open source implementation of financial date arithmetic

Fixed income analysis
Settlement (finance)